sec-Amyl acetate is an organic compound and an ester.  It is formed in an esterification reaction of sec-amyl alcohol (2-pentanol) and acetic acid.  It is a colorless liquid.

References

Acetate esters